The Clip Selection is Do As Infinity's third video collection.

Track listing
 "Tangerine Dream"
 "Heart"
 "Oasis"
 "Yesterday & Today"
 "Rumble Fish"
 "We Are."
 "Desire"
 "Week!"
 
  (Propaganda Clip)

External links
 The Clip Selectionat Avex Network 

Do As Infinity video albums